The Rwanda women's national rugby union team are a national sporting side of the Rwanda, representing them at rugby union. The side first played in 2005.

Results summary
(Full internationals only)

Results

Full internationals

Other internationals

Other matches

See also
 Rugby union in Rwanda

Notes

External links
 Friends of Rwanda Rugby.org
 Rwanda on World Rugby
 Rwanda on rugbydata.com

Sport in Rwanda
Women's national rugby union teams
African national women's rugby union teams
Rugby union
Rugby union in Rwanda
2005 establishments in Rwanda